Izingane Zoma are a Maskandi group from Nquthu, KwaZulu-Natal, South Africa formed in 1993. Their politically inspired songs have attracted wide discussion and chart success in their home country. This vocal trio has enjoyed a string of gold and platinum-level record sales in the South African market. The group were SATMA nominees in 2011, in the category of Best Video.

All of the group's songs are composed by the Khuzwayo brothers - Shobeni and Busani. Shobeni is also the Producer of the group, while Busani regularly performs guitar.

The live band includes drums, bass guitar, guitar, concertina, plus of course the vocals and dancers.

Band members

Current members
 Thandoluni Phungula - lead vocals
 Bongekile Ngobese  passed away
 Tholakele Ngobese - vocals
 Busani - guitarist and backing
 Shobeni - producer and backing

Discography

Singles
 "Msholozi" 2006
 "Mzilikaze kaMashobane" 2011 June
 "Obama" (album) 2011 September
 "uMalema" 2011 November

Awards and nominations

References

External links
 Artist profile at musicdealers.com

Maskanda musicians
South African musical groups
Musical groups established in 1993
1993 establishments in South Africa